The Prince George Kodiaks are a Canadian Junior Football League (CJFL) team located in Prince George, British Columbia. The team plays in the British Columbia Football Conference (BCFC) which is part of the CJFL and compete annually for the national title known as the Canadian Bowl.

History
On July 9, 2021, it was announced that the Kodiaks had been granted an expansion team to begin play in the British Columbia Football Conference starting in the 2022 season. Keon Raymond was announced as the team's director of football operations and inaugural head coach. The Kodiaks play their home games at Masich Place Stadium.

References

Canadian football teams in British Columbia
Canadian Junior Football League teams
Sport in Prince George, British Columbia
Sports clubs established in 2022
2020s establishments in British Columbia